The 2015 Taça de Portugal Final was the final match of the 2014–15 Taça de Portugal, the 75th season of the Taça de Portugal. It was played on 31 May 2015 at the Estádio Nacional in Oeiras between Sporting CP and Braga. Sporting CP won 3–1 on penalties following a 2–2 draw after extra-time to claim their 16th title in the competition and their first official trophy since the 2008 Supertaça Cândido de Oliveira. This was also the first time the Campeonato de Portugal/Taça de Portugal final was decided by a penalty shootout.

As the 2014–15 Taça de Portugal winners, Sporting CP earned the right to play in the 2015–16 UEFA Europa League group stage. However, since they qualified for the 2015–16 UEFA Champions League play-off round through their league placing, their cup winners place in the 2015–16 UEFA Europa League group stage is transferred to the highest-placed team in the league qualified for the UEFA Europa League (Braga), with the highest-placed team in the league that has not qualified to the European competitions (Belenenses) receiving a place in the third qualifying round.

Also, as cup winners, Sporting CP played against Benfica, the league winners, in the 2015 Supertaça Cândido de Oliveira, winning 1–0.

Match

Details

Statistics

Broadcasting
The final was broadcast in Portugal on television by RTP (on RTP1), who holds the rights for several Portuguese Football Federation properties (which includes the Taça de Portugal final, the Supertaça Cândido de Oliveira and the Portugal national football team exhibition matches), and by SportTV (on SportTV 1) who holds the rights to broadcast the whole Taça de Portugal. RTP produced the broadcast, following FIFA guidelines for World Cup broadcasting. RTP also broadcast the match worldwide, on RTP Internacional.

References

2015
2014–15 in Portuguese football
Sporting CP matches
S.C. Braga matches
Association football penalty shoot-outs